Route 415, also known as Nipper's Harbour Road, is a  north–south highway on the Baie Verte Peninsula of Newfoundland in the Canadian Province of Newfoundland and Labrador. It serves as the only road access to the town of Nipper's Harbour, connecting it with Route 414 (La Scie Highway) at the other end. Route 415 is a winding, two-lane, gravel road for its entire length, with no other major intersections or highways of any kind, traveling almost exclusively through wooded and hilly terrain.

Major intersections

References

415